Stork is the surname of:

 Alberto van Klaveren Stork (born 1948), Dutch-born Chilean political scientist, lawyer and diplomat
 Alfred Stork (1871–1945), Canadian businessman and politician
 Ankie Stork (c. 1922–2015), Dutch resistance fighter during World War II
 Clarence Stork (1896–1970), English-born Canadian farmer and politician
 Eric O. Stork (1927-2014), American Environmental Protection Agency regulator
 Gilbert Stork (1921–2017), Belgian-born U.S. chemist
 Henry Knight Storks (1811-1874), British Army lieutenant-general and colonial governor
 Hermann Stork (1911–1962), German diver and 1936 Olympic bronze medalist
 Janice Stork, American businessperson and mayor of Lancaster, Pennsylvania (1990-1998)
 Jeff Stork (born 1960), American head women's volleyball coach at Cal State Northridge and former volleyball player
 Joe Stork, American political activist and Deputy Director for Middle East and North Africa at Human Rights Watch
 Olga Stork (born 1998), Lithuanian gymnast
 Sture Stork (1930-2002), Swedish sailor in the 1956 and 1964 Olympics
 Travis Lane Stork (born 1972), a doctor on The Bachelor and The Doctors US TV shows
 Wendy Stork, a tennis player - see 1947 Wimbledon Championships – Women's Singles
 William Stork (died 1768), oculist in England and the American colonies